Consequent to the General Elections held on 27 April 1996 and 2 May 1996 the Governor appointed M. Karunanidhi as Chief Minister of Tamil Nadu with effect from 13 May 1996. The Governor on the advice of the Chief Minister appointed Twenty-five more Ministers on the same day.

Cabinet ministers

References 

Dravida Munnetra Kazhagam
1996 in Indian politics
Tamil Nadu ministries
1990s in Tamil Nadu
1996 establishments in Tamil Nadu
2001 disestablishments in India
Cabinets established in 1996
Cabinets disestablished in 2001